The Clark County Courthouse is an historic building in Vancouver, Washington, in the United States. The building is listed on the National Register of Historic Places.

See also
 List of county courthouses in Washington (state)
 National Register of Historic Places listings in Clark County, Washington

External links
 

Buildings and structures in Vancouver, Washington
National Register of Historic Places in Clark County, Washington